Tacheng Prefecture is located in the Northern Xinjiang, People's Republic of China. It is a part of Ili Kazakh Autonomous Prefecture. The prefecture level city of Karamay forms a separate enclave in the middle of Tacheng.

Subdivisions 
Tacheng prefecture is divided into 3 county level cities, 3 counties, and 1 autonomous county.

Geography

See Emin Valley, Tarbagatai Mountains, Saur Mountains, Gurbantünggüt Desert.

Heads

Secretary 
 Li Fengzi  -1991.05
 Li Guimao 1991.06-1994.07 	 	
 Wu Qilin 1994.07-2000.04 	
 Tang Dingbang 2000.04-2004.11 	
 Peng Jiarui 2004.11-2011.07 	
 Zhang Bo 2011.07-2015.01 
 Xue Bin since 2017.03

Governors 
 Baspaı Sholaquly Баспай Шолақұлы  1945–1952
 Arystanbek (Арыстанбек) (阿尔斯坦别克) 1983.-1993.06
 Alpısbaý Raxımulı 1993.06-1997.01
 Qızaýjan Seýilqojaulı 1996.12-2003.01
 Tilepaldı Äbdiraşïd 2003.01-2008.01 :zh:铁力瓦尔迪·阿不都热西提
 Mänen Zeýnelulı 2008.01-2012.04 
 Aqanulı Sarqıt :zh:沙尔合提·阿汗 2012.04-2016.06 
 Muqïyat Jarmuqamet2016.06-present

References 

 
Prefecture-level divisions of Xinjiang